Anton Pichler (also called Andy Pichler, born 4 October 1955) is a retired football defender.

During his club career, Pichler played for Sturm Graz for 13 seasons before finishing his career with SKN St. Pölten. He also made 11 appearances for the Austria national team, including the 1982 FIFA World Cup in Spain.

External links
 
 

1955 births
Living people
Austrian footballers
Austria international footballers
Association football defenders
1982 FIFA World Cup players
SK Sturm Graz players
People from Weiz District
Footballers from Styria